Rochester Rhinos played their fifteenth season in professional soccer and first in the temporary USSF D2 Pro League in 2010.

Current roster 
as of June 16, 2010

Staff
 Bob Lilley (2010–present)

Schedule and results

2010 U.S. Open Cup

Regular season

References

Rochester New York FC seasons
Rochester Rhinos
Rochester Rhinos Season, 2010
Rochester Rhinos